Alfredo Mury (3 December 1908 – 14 July 1997) was a Guatemalan sports shooter. He competed in two events at the 1952 Summer Olympics.

References

1908 births
1997 deaths
Guatemalan male sport shooters
Olympic shooters of Guatemala
Shooters at the 1952 Summer Olympics
Place of birth missing